Neptune was launched in the Thirteen Colonies in 1778. She entered Lloyd's Register as Neptune in 1786. (She apparently entered British ownership in 1785, but Lloyd's Register was not published in 1785.) She then sailed as general merchantman. In the late 1790s she was a whaler in the British southern whale fishery. She was last listed in 1803, though the data is stale and she was last surveyed in 1797.


Career
Lloyd's Register (1786) listed Neptune with P. Martin, master and owner, and trade London–Jamaica, changing to London–Maryland. Lloyd's List, however, reported on 4 October 1784 that Neptune, Martin, master, from Suriname, had arrived at Hispaniola, and was expected to sail from Port-au-Prince to Quebec in mid-August.

Lloyd's List reported on 5 June 1789 that Neptune, Martin, master, had had to put back into Waterford after having been out some three weeks. She had become very leaky.

Lloyd's Register for 1797 showed Neptunes master changing from J. French to T. Hopper, and her trade to London–South Seas. Neptune was mentioned in the Protection Lists.

Captain Hopper sailed Neptune in 1797 on a whaling voyage to the East Coast of Africa. She was at Delagoa Bay in late June 1798. Lion had been carrying a cargo from Madras and Columbo to England when she had put into Delagoa Bay in distress. Despite the efforts of the three other English ships and three American ships there, Lion could not be saved.

Neptune and Eliza towed Lion farther up the Maputo River and then remained for some weeks. Eventually, all three British whalers left with only a portion of the cargo. The bulk of Lions cargo was to go on Britannia, which had since arrived.

Citations

References
 
White, William M. (1800) Journal of a Voyage Performed in the Lion Extra Indiaman, from Madras to Columbo and Da Lagoa Bay ... in the Year 1798: With Some Account of the Manners and Customs of the Inhabitants of Da Lagoa Bay and a Vocabulary of the Language. (John Stockdale).

1778 ships
Age of Sail merchant ships of England
Whaling ships